EasyJet: Inside the Cockpit  is a British documentary miniseries featuring EasyJet crew members and their careers. The series was narrated by Stephen Fry and was aired on the British television network ITV. It aired from 14 August 2017 until 16 May 2019.

The series features new cadet pilot candidates while training to become EasyJet first officers.

References 

2017 British television series debuts
2019 British television series endings
2010s British documentary television series
ITV documentaries
Documentary television series about aviation
English-language television shows